William Pulver is a former Australian sporting administrator. He was the CEO of the Australian Rugby Union after succeeding John O'Neill in early 2013.

Pulver's daughter Madeleine was the victim of the Mosman bomb hoax in 2011.

Personal life

Pulver attended Shore School, class of 1977, and then the University of New South Wales. He is a member of the 2013 Board of Trustees for the Shore School Foundation.

Pulver is married with four children. The family owns properties in Mosman, Avoca Beach, and Bungendore.

See also
 Israel Folau

References

Australian sports executives and administrators
Rugby union people in Australia
Living people
1959 births